Imagine the Sound is a 1981 Canadian documentary film about the once-controversial genre of free jazz, directed by Ron Mann. It serves as Mann's feature film directorial debut.

Background
Imagine the Sound marks Mann's feature film directorial debut; he made the film while he was still in his early twenties. The film deals with the once-controversial genre of free jazz.

Shot entirely in Toronto, the film features interviews with and musical and dramatic performances by pianist Cecil Taylor, saxophonist Archie Shepp, trumpeter Bill Dixon, and pianist Paul Bley. Bill Smith features as the interviewer of the film's subjects.

Availability
The film has been digitally restored and was released on DVD in 2007.

Reception
Critic and film historian Jonathan Rosenbaum has said that Imagine the Sound “may be the best documentary on free jazz that we have.”

See also
Toronto New Wave-the film movement Ron Mann was part of in 1980s Canada
Ornette: Made in America- the 1985 Shirley Clarke documentary film about free jazz pioneer Ornette Coleman
Poetry in Motion-a 1982 documentary film also by Mann

References

External links 
 
 
 Imagine the Sound on AllMovie

1981 films
English-language Canadian films
Canadian documentary films
Films directed by Ron Mann
Documentary films about jazz music and musicians
1981 documentary films
1980s English-language films
1980s Canadian films